The 27th Robert Awards ceremony was held on 7 February 2010 in Copenhagen, Denmark. Organized by the Danish Film Academy, the awards honoured the best in Danish and foreign film of 2009.

Honorees

Best Danish Film 
 Antichrist

Best Children's Film 
 Superbror – Birger Larsen

Best Director 
 Lars von Trier – Antichrist

Best Screenplay 
 Lars von Trier – Antichrist

Best Actor in a Leading Role 
 Lars Mikkelsen – Headhunter (2009 film)

Best Actress in a Leading Role 
 Paprika Steen – Applause

Best Actor in a Supporting Role 
 Henning Moritzen – Headhunter (2009 film)

Best Actress in a Supporting Role 
 Pernille Vallentin – Deliver Us from Evil

Best Production Design 
 Søren Kragh Sørensen & Finn Richardt – Kærestesorger

Best Cinematography 
 Anthony Dod Mantle – Antichrist

Best Costume Design 
 Anne-Dorte Fischer – Kærestesorger

Best Makeup 
 Malin Birch-Jensen & Karina Åse – Kærestesorger

Best Editing 
 Anders Refn – Antichrist

Best Sound Design 
 Kristian Eidnes Andersen – Antichrist

Best Score 
 Tina Dickow – Oldboys

Best Special Effects 
 Peter Hjorth, Soda ApS and Ota Bares – Antichrist

Best Song 
 Tina Dickow – "Rebel Song" – Oldboys

Best Short Fiction/Animation 
 Megaheavy – Fenar Ahmad

Best Long Fiction/Animation 
 Bobby – Julie Bille

Documentary Short 
 Ønskebørn – Birgitte Stærmose

Best Documentary Feature 
 Fra Haifa til Nørrebro -

Best American Film 
 Up – Pete Docter

Best Non-American Film 
 Slumdog Millionaire – Danny Boyle

Audience Award

See also 

 2010 Bodil Awards

References

External links 
  
 dfi.dk 

2009 film awards
Robert Awards ceremonies
2010 in Copenhagen
February 2010 events in Europe